This is a list of traditional top-level regions of China.

Republic of China (1912–1949)

Nationalist Era regions

NRA military regions

People's Republic of China

Statistical regions 

This is a list of the 34 provincial-level divisions of the People's Republic of China grouped by its former greater administrative areas from 1949 to 1952.

Other kinds of statistics

Economic regions

PLA military regions

See also 

 Administrative divisions of China
 List of ecoregions in China
 Northern and southern China
 Physiographic macroregions of China
 Regional discrimination in China

Geography of China by region
Regions
Regions